The following outline provides an overview of and topical guide to entertainment and the entertainment industry:

Entertainment is any activity which provides a diversion or permits people to amuse themselves in their leisure time, and may also provide fun, enjoyment, and laughter. People may create their own entertainment, such as when they spontaneously invent a  game; participate actively in an activity they find entertaining, such as when they play sport as a hobby; or consume an entertainment product passively, such as when they attend a performance.

The entertainment industry (informally known as show business or show biz) is part of the tertiary sector of the economy and includes many sub-industries devoted to entertainment. However, the term is often used in the mass media to describe the mass media companies that control the distribution and manufacture of mass media entertainment. In the popular parlance, the term show biz in particular connotes the commercially popular performing arts, especially musical theatre, vaudeville, comedy, film, fun, and music. It applies to every aspect of entertainment including cinema, television, radio, theatre, and music.

Types of entertainment

Exhibition entertainment 

 Amusement parks
 Art exhibits 
 Fairs
 Festivals
 Museums 
 Trade shows 
 Traveling carnivals
 Travelling exhibition 
 Water parks
 Wax museums
 Zoos

Live entertainment 
 Air shows
 Banquet
 Burlesque
 American burlesque
 Neo-Burlesque
 Victorian burlesque
 Cabaret
 Circus  
 Contemporary circus
 Comedy clubs 
 Concerts 
 Concert residencies
 Concert tours
 Dance 
 Discotheques
 Drag shows
 Drama 
Escape Rooms
 Fireworks 
 Fashion shows
 Ice shows
 Improvisational theatre
 Magic 
 Minstrel shows
 Music hall
 Musical theatre 
 Nightclubs  
 Operas 
 Parades 
 Parties
 Performance art
 Performing arts
 Marching arts
 Color guard
 Drum and bugle corps
 Indoor percussion ensemble
 Marching band
 Pep band
 Winter guard
 Professional wrestling/Sports entertainment
 Puppet shows 
 Raves
 Revues
 Sideshows
 Spectator sports 
 Stand-up comedy 
 Street theatre
 Strip clubs
 Symphonies
 Theatre 
 Variety show 
 Vaudeville
 Ventriloquism
 Video art
 Wild West shows

Mass media entertainment industry 
 Live entertainment
 Musical theatre
 Plays
 Performance art
 Comedy
 Drama
 Sports
 Film
 Film studios
 Movie theaters / cinemas
 Film score
 Film production
 Acting
 Broadcasting
 Television
 Television programs 
 Reality television
 Radio 
 Radio programs 
 Podcast
Animation
 Music industry
 Composers and songwriters
 Singers and musicians
 Choirs
 Orchestras
 Concert bands
 Karaokes
 Concert hall
 News media
 Web television
 News articles
 Fashion industry
 Modeling
Literature

Digital Entertainment Industry  
 Online Digital Content Videos
 Comedy sketch,short films,vlogs
 Digital Music

Electronic entertainment 
 SMS content
 Video game industry
 Video games
 Toys

History of entertainment

Entertainment by historical period 
 Entertainment in the 16th century
 Entertainment during the Great Depression

History by entertainment type

History of exhibition entertainment 
 History of amusement parks
 History of art exhibitions
 History of fairs
 History of museums
 History of theme parks
 History of trade shows
 History of wax museums

History of live entertainment 
 History of busking
 History of the circus
 History of comedy
 History of comedy clubs
 History of concerts
 History of dance
 History of fireworks
 History of musical theatre
 History of nightclubs
 History of discotheques
 History of opera
 History of parades
 History of performance art
 History of plays
 History of magic
 History of sports
 History of striptease
 History of lap dancing
 History of strip clubs
 History of theatre
 History of variety shows
 History of vaudeville

History of mass media entertainment 
 History of animation
 History of film
 History of literature
 History of magazines
 History of the music industry
 History of new media
 History of radio
 History of radio programming
 History of sound recording
 History of television
 History of television programs
 History of video games

Entertainment law 
 Entertainment law
 Copyright Term Extension Act

General concepts 
 Acrobatics 
 Aerial acts 
 Animal training 
 Applause 
 Beauty pageant 
 Celebrity 
 Chinese yo-yo 
 Circus 
 Circus skills
 Clown 
 Comedian 
 Comedy 
 Contact juggling 
 Contemporary circus 
 Contortion 
 Corde lisse 
 Cyr wheel
 Devil sticks 
 Diabolo 
 Equilibristics 
 Fire breathing 
 Fire eating 
 Geisha 
 German wheel 
 Hand-to-hand balancing 
 Hula hoop 
 Human cannonball 
 Humor 
 Horse riding 
 Internet humor 
 Ice skating 
 Impalement arts 
 Juggling 
 Knife throwing 
 List of beauty contests 
 List of persons who have won Academy, Emmy, Grammy, and Tony Awards 
 Magic 
 Mime 
 New media 
 Old time radio 
 Performing arts 
 Plate spinning 
 Radio 
 Radio programming 
 Rock opera 
 Rodeo clown 
 Roller skating 
 Sex industry 
 Show business 
 Showstopper 
 Sideshow 
 Spanish web 
 Stiltwalking 
 Sword swallowing 
 Show jumping 
 Teen idol 
 Tightrope walking 
 Trapeze 
 Unicycle 
 Ventriloquism

Notable entertainers 
 List of circuses and circus owners
 List of clowns
 List of comedians
 List of film and television directors
 List of film score composers
 List of magicians
 List of professional wrestlers
 List of theatre directors
 Lists of actors
 Lists of entertainers
 Lists of musicians
 Lists of sportspeople
 List of entertainment industry dynasties

See also 
 Drama
 Performance
 Television
 Theatre
 Outline of dance
 Outline of film
 Outline of literature
 Outline of music
 Outline of performing arts
 Outline of sports
 Outline of theatre
 Media of New York City
 List of movie-related topics
 Gambling
 Cinema of the United States

External links 

 DMOZ Open Directory Project - listing for Entertainment

entertainment
entertainment